Wishing Well (foaled April 12, 1975 in California - died 1999 in Ireland) was an American Thoroughbred racing mare who won twelve of her thirty-six starts and who secured her place in Thoroughbred history as the dam of Sunday Silence, the 1989 Kentucky Derby, Preakness Stakes and Breeders' Cup Classic winner who was voted American Horse of the Year, inducted in the U.S. Racing Hall of Fame in 1996, and who was the Leading sire in Japan for thirteen straight years between 1995 and 2007.

Wishing Well died at Coolmore Stud in Ireland at age twenty-four in 1999 as a result of complications from colic.

References

 Wishing Well's pedigree and partial racing stats

1975 racehorse births
Racehorses bred in California
Racehorses trained in the United States
Thoroughbred family 3-e